

 
Nemarluk is a locality in the Northern Territory of Australia located about  south-west of the territorial capital of  Darwin.

It consists of land bounded in part by the Daly River and the Timor Sea in the north and north-west respectively,  in part by the Fitzmaurice River in the south, and in part again by the Daly River in the east.

Nemarluk is named in commemoration of Nemarluk (circa 1911 -1940), an aboriginal man  notable as an “Indigenous resistance fighter”, a murderer  and as a prisoner.   The locality's boundaries and name were gazetted on 4 April 2007.

The 2016 Australian census which was conducted in August 2016 reports that Nemarluk had 131 people living within its boundaries.

Nemarluk is located within the federal division of Lingiari, the territory electoral division of Daly and the local government areas of the Victoria Daly Region and the West Daly Region.

References
 

Populated places in the Northern Territory
Victoria Daly Region